Eric Reyes (born March 13, 1992) is an American-born, Puerto Rican international soccer player currently without a club.

Playing career

Youth and college 
Reyes has played college soccer for the UC Santa Barbara Gauchos and Florida International University.

Professional 
Reyes signed with Bayamón F.C. in April 2013, but was released at the conclusion of the season.

International 
Reyes made his international debut for the Puerto Rico national football team on September 6, 2011 against Canada at the age of 19 years.

References

External links 
 
 
 FIU player profile
 UC Santa Barbara player profile

1992 births
Living people
Puerto Rican footballers
Puerto Rico international footballers
UC Santa Barbara Gauchos men's soccer players
FIU Panthers men's soccer players
Bayamón FC players
Association football goalkeepers